Diego Fuser (born 11 November 1968) is an Italian former professional footballer, who played as a midfielder, mainly on the right wing, although he was also capable of playing in the centre. Fuser was a quick, hard-working, and energetic player, with good technique, and crossing ability, who excelled at making offensive runs down the right flank and assisting strikers with accurate crosses. A tenacious, and physically strong winger, he also possessed notable stamina, a powerful shot from distance, and was accurate from set-pieces.

Club career
Born in Venaria Reale, Province of Turin, Fuser started his professional career with Torino in 1986. He played 49 games for them before moving to A.C. Milan (1989–92). During his two seasons at Milan he collected a UEFA Champions League (1989) medal and a Scudetto (1988), as well as the 1989 European Super Cup and Intercontinental Cup titles.

During his time at Milan, Fuser also spent time on loan at Fiorentina during the 1990–91 season, before completing a move to Lazio in 1992. This turned out to be arguably his most successful time in football becoming a fan favourite while playing 188 games in six years, scoring 35 goals and winning the Coppa Italia and reaching the UEFA Cup Final in 1998, as the club's captain. After moving to Parma in 1998 he won the UEFA Cup, the Coppa Italia and the Italian Super Cup in 1999. He wore the number 14 shirt and captained the team in their 3–0 1999 UEFA Cup Final victory over Olympique Marseille on 6 May.

Fuser blotted his Lazio copybook by joining A.S. Roma in the summer of 2001, where he only played 15 games in two seasons, winning the 2001 Supercoppa Italiana, and managing second-place finishes in Serie A in 2002, and in the Coppa Italia in 2003. During the 2003–04 season he played for his original club Torino, in Serie B.

In the lower leagues
In 2004, he signed for A.S.D.C. Canelli, whom he helped to win its Eccellenza round during the 2005–06 season, earning promotion to Serie D. In 2008, together with fellow player and personal friend Gianluigi Lentini, he moved to Saviglianese, a Promozione amateur club of Piedmont. He played also for the amateur clubs of Canelli and Nicese, which he simultaneously coached. In 2012, he played for another amateur club of Piedmont, Colline Alfieri Don Bosco in Promozione.

International career
Fuser initially represented Italy at Under-21 level on 18 occasions between 1987 and 1990, scoring 2 goals; he was notably a member of the team that finished in third place at the 1990 UEFA European Under-21 Championship, under manager Cesare Maldini. He also played for the senior Italy national football team on 25 occasions between 1993 and 2000, scoring 3 goals, and he was a participant at the 1996 UEFA European Championship under manager Arrigo Sacchi, making 3 appearances as Italy were eliminated in the first found. He was also in Dino Zoff's provisional 26 man squad for UEFA Euro 2000 before missing the final cut.

Personal life
Diego Fuser is married to Orietta. Their son Matteo died in 2011, at the age of 15, after struggling with illness.

Honours

Club
Milan
Serie A: 1991–92
European Cup: 1989–90
European Super Cup: 1989
Intercontinental Cup: 1989

Lazio
Coppa Italia: 1997–98
UEFA Cup runner-up: 1997–98

Parma
Coppa Italia: 1998–99
UEFA Cup: 1998–99
Supercoppa Italiana: 1999

Roma
Supercoppa Italiana: 2001
Serie A runner-up: 2001–02
Coppa Italia runner-up: 2002–03

References

External links

1968 births
Living people
People from Venaria Reale
Association football midfielders
Italian footballers
Italy international footballers
Italy under-21 international footballers
Torino F.C. players
ACF Fiorentina players
A.C. Milan players
S.S. Lazio players
Parma Calcio 1913 players
A.S. Roma players
Serie A players
Serie B players
Serie D players
UEFA Euro 1996 players
Italy B international footballers
UEFA Cup winning players
Footballers from Piedmont
Sportspeople from the Metropolitan City of Turin